"You Are the One" is a song by Norwegian band A-ha, released as the fourth single from their third studio album, Stay on These Roads (1988). It was remixed by Justin Strauss for single release. The music video was filmed in New York City.

Track listings
UK 7-inch single: Warner Bros. / W 7636
 "You Are the One" (Remix) - 3:47
 "Out of Blue Comes Green" (Album Version) - 6:41
 Track 1 is remixed by Justin Strauss

UK 12-inch single: Warner Bros. / W 7636T United Kingdom
 "You Are the One" (12″ Remix) - 6:31
 "You Are the One" (Instrumental) - 3:56
 "Out of Blue Comes Green" (Album Version) - 6:41
 Also released as a 12-inch picture disc (W 7636TP)
 Track 1 is remixed by Justin Strauss

UK CD single: Warner Bros. / W 7636CD
 "You Are the One" (7″ Remix) - 3:47
 Scoundrel Days (Album Version) - 3:56
 "Out of Blue Comes Green" (Album Version) - 6:41

Charts

References

1988 songs
1988 singles
A-ha songs
Song recordings produced by Alan Tarney
Songs written by Magne Furuholmen
Songs written by Paul Waaktaar-Savoy
Warner Records singles